Forest Hill is a small community in the Canadian province of Nova Scotia, located in  Kings County.

References
Forest Hill on Destination Nova Scotia

Communities in Kings County, Nova Scotia
General Service Areas in Nova Scotia